Harald Braun (26 April 1901 – 24 September 1960) was a German film director, screenwriter and film producer. He directed 21 films between 1942 and 1960.

Selected filmography

 The Roundabouts of Handsome Karl (dir. Carl Froelich, 1938, writer)
 Love Me (dir. Harald Braun, 1942)
 Between Heaven and Earth (dir. Harald Braun, 1942)
 Nora (dir. Harald Braun, 1944)
 Dreaming (dir. Harald Braun, 1944)
 Between Yesterday and Tomorrow (dir. Harald Braun, 1947)
 The Lost Face (1948)
 Keepers of the Night (dir. Harald Braun, 1949)
 The Falling Star (dir. Harald Braun, 1950)
 The Man Who Wanted to Live Twice (dir. Victor Tourjansky, 1950)
 Fanfares of Love (dir. Kurt Hoffmann, 1951)
 No Greater Love (dir. Harald Braun, 1952)
 Father Needs a Wife (dir. Harald Braun, 1952)
 Fanfare of Marriage (dir. Hans Grimm, 1953)
 As Long as You're Near Me (dir. Harald Braun, 1953)
  Must We Get Divorced? (dir. Hans Schweikart, 1953)
 His Royal Highness (dir. Harald Braun, 1953)
 The Last Summer (dir. Harald Braun, 1954)
 The Last Man (dir. Harald Braun, 1955)
 Sky Without Stars (dir. Helmut Käutner, 1955)
 A Girl Without Boundaries (1955)
 Beloved Enemy (dir. Rolf Hansen, 1955)
 Reaching for the Stars (dir. Carl-Heinz Schroth, 1955)
 Regine (Two Worlds) (dir. Harald Braun, 1956)
 King in Shadow (dir. Harald Braun, 1957)
 The Glass Tower (dir. Harald Braun, 1957)
 The Buddenbrooks (dir. Alfred Weidenmann, 1959)
 The Ambassador (dir. Harald Braun, 1960)

References

External links

1901 births
1960 deaths
Mass media people from Berlin